Album recorded by female Japanese pop artist Watanabe Misato. It was released on July 10, 2002 by Sony Music Entertainment.

Track listing 

YOU - Atarashii Basho (=The new venue) -
egoism
truth
soleil
Watashi ga suki na Kodoku (=My Favorite solitude)
Natsuyaki Tamago (=The summer burning egg)
Blue
Hana (=Flower) - Kono Boku de Ikite Yuku (=I'll live with this me) -
Song of the Asking
Koi no Uta (=Song of Love)
Caramel Blood

External links 
Sony Music Entertainment - Official site for Watanabe Misato. 
Album Page - Direct link to page with song listing and music samples.

2002 albums
Misato Watanabe albums